Oakley railway station may refer to:

 Oakley railway station (Bedfordshire): operated by the Midland Railway in Bedford, England, and closed in 1958
 Oakley railway station (Hampshire): operated by the London and South Western Railway and closed in 1963
 Oakley railway station (Scotland): operated by the North British Railway and closed in 1968
 Oakley station (California): a planned Amtrak California station